The old Santa Cruz High School was located in Santa Cruz, New Mexico. The school opened in 1925 to a group of 89 students. In 1925 it was the only high school in Española until 1930 when Española High School opened. The colors for SCHS were Royal Blue and Gold and their mascot was a Crusader. In 1976 the school closed with an enrollment of 690 students. In 1977 a new high school was built joining both the students from Española High School and Santa Cruz, the school was named Española Valley High School and was located on El Lano Road outside of Española city limits.

Educational institutions established in 1925
1925 establishments in New Mexico
Educational institutions disestablished in 1976
1976 disestablishments in New Mexico
Defunct schools in New Mexico
Schools in Santa Fe County, New Mexico